Henri Cochet defeated Frank Hunter in the final, 4–6, 6–4, 3–6, 7–5, 6–3 to win the men's singles tennis title at the 1928 U.S. National Championships. It was Cochet's first U.S. Championships singles title and fourth major singles title overall.

René Lacoste was the two-time reigning champion, but did not participate that year.

Seeds
The tournament used two lists of players for seeding the men's singles event; one list of eight U.S. players and one list of six foreign players. Henri Cochet is the champion; others show the round in which they were eliminated.

  John F. Hennessey (first round)
  George Lott (semifinals)
  Wilmer Allison (second round)
  John Van Ryn (third round)
  John Doeg (quarterfinals)
  Francis Hunter (finalist)
  Frank Shields (semifinals)
  Fritz Mercur (semifinals)

  Henri Cochet (champion)
  Jean Borotra (third round)
  Bunny Austin (third round)
  Colin Gregory (first round)
  Jacques Brugnon (quarterfinals)
  Jack Crawford (quarterfinals)
  Jack Cummings (second round)
  Edgar Moon (first round)

Draw

Final eight

Earlier rounds

References

Men's singles
1928